Sisse is a Danish female given name. Notable people with this name include:

 Sisse Brimberg (born 1948), Danish photographer
 Sisse Fisker (born 1976), Danish television presenter
 Sisse Graum Jørgensen (born 1972), Danish film producer
 Sisse Marie (born 1985), Danish singer, model, TV hostess and songwriter
 Sisse Reingaard (born 1946), Danish film actress